R347 road may refer to:
 R347 road (Ireland)
 R347 road (South Africa)